Ramon Guiteras (August 17, 1858 – December 13, 1917) was a pioneering surgeon who specialized in urology and founded the American Urological Association.

Early life and education
He was born in Bristol, Rhode Island, and graduated from Harvard College and Harvard Medical School. He was the cousin of Juan Guiteras, the noted Cuban doctor.

He became an officer in the United States Army National Guard, and served as the assistant surgeon for the Second Battery of Artillery, First Brigade of the New York Army National Guard, where he was promoted to first lieutenant on May 9, 1890. He was honorably discharged on July 26, 1893 as a captain. He also served 1881–1883 in the Boston Cadets.

Later life and legacy
He died in New York City on December 13, 1917. He is buried in Juniper Hill Cemetery in Bristol. In his will he left $350,000 to build a school in Bristol to honor his mother, which resulted in Guiteras Memorial School (1925). He was inducted into the Rhode Island Heritage Hall of Fame in 2009. The American Urological Association has an annual award named after him for the individual who is deemed to have made outstanding contributions to the art and science of urology.

Publications
  Volume 1 and Volume 2 (of two).

References

Further reading

 
  Obituary for his sister.
 
   Guiteras' genealogy.
 
 
  Bibliographic information only.

External links

 
 Ramon Guiteras Award at the American Urological Association

1858 births
1917 deaths
American urologists
Harvard College alumni
Harvard Medical School alumni
National Guard (United States) officers
New York National Guard personnel
People from Bristol, Rhode Island
United States Army Medical Corps officers
Burials at Juniper Hill Cemetery